Maxence Carlier (born 15 March 1997) is a French professional footballer who plays as a right-back for  club Sedan.

Club career
On 13 July 2017, Carlier signed his first professional contract with his childhood club Lens. Carlier made his professional debut for Lens in a 1–0 Ligue 2 loss to Auxerre on 31 February 2017.

On 31 August 2017, Carlier joined Belgian club Tubize on loan for the remainder of the 2017–18 season. The following August he was loaned to Tours for the season, and at the start of the 2019–20 season to Laval, where he went on to sign a permanent deal in January 2020. 

In May 2022, he signed for Sedan.

Honours 
Laval

 Championnat National: 2021–22

References

External links
 
 

1997 births
Living people
People from Lens, Pas-de-Calais
Sportspeople from Pas-de-Calais
Association football fullbacks
French footballers
RC Lens players
A.F.C. Tubize players
Tours FC players
Stade Lavallois players
CS Sedan Ardennes players
Ligue 2 players
Championnat National players
Challenger Pro League players
French expatriate footballers
French expatriate sportspeople in Belgium
Expatriate footballers in Belgium
Footballers from Hauts-de-France